Robert Burnette Adams (July 24, 1901 – October 17, 1996) was an American professional baseball pitcher in Major League Baseball.

Biography
Adams was born in Holyoke, Massachusetts and attended Lehigh University. While at Lehigh, he played both football and baseball.

A right-handed pitcher, Adams appeared in two games with the Boston Red Sox during the 1925 season. He debuted on September 22, 1925. A day later, he played his final game.

In 5 innings pitched, Adams came out of the bullpen and got no decisions, allowing five earned runs (7.94) and giving up 10 hits with one strikeout and three walks. As a hitter, he went 1-for-3 with one run scored.

From the 1929 season through the 1937 season, Adams coached the Lehigh Engineers baseball program at Lehigh University in Bethlehem, Pennsylvania. He also worked as an assistant coach with the school's football program.

Death
Adams died in Lemoyne, Pennsylvania on October 17, 1996 at the age of ninety-five.

References

External links

MLB historical statistics

1901 births
1996 deaths
Major League Baseball pitchers
Boston Red Sox players
Lehigh Mountain Hawks baseball coaches
Lehigh Mountain Hawks baseball players
Lehigh Mountain Hawks football coaches
Lehigh Mountain Hawks football players
Sportspeople from Holyoke, Massachusetts
Baseball players from Massachusetts
Players of American football from Massachusetts